Marko Zelenika (born April 24, 1987) is a Croatian footballer who most recently played for German amateur side Posavina Frankfurt.

Career 
Zelenika had a stint in the Croatian Second Football League with NK Slavonija Požega. He played in the Croatian First Football League during the 2005/06 season with NK Kamen Ingrad. In 2007, he played abroad in the Premier League of Bosnia and Herzegovina with NK Široki Brijeg. During his tenure with Široki Brijeg he featured in the 2007–08 UEFA Cup against FC Koper, and Hapoel Tel Aviv F.C. He also made appearances in the 2008–09 UEFA Cup against FK Partizani Tirana, and Beşiktaş J.K.

In 2009, he returned to Croatia to play with HNK Suhopolje. In 2011, he played in the Croatian Second Football League with NK Imotski, and had a loan spell with NK Rudeš. He later played in the Treća HNL with BŠK Zmaj, and NK Oriolik. The following season he played with NK Pajde Möhlin, and featured in the 2015 Croatian World Club Championship, where he was named best player in the tournament. He played once more abroad in 2016 with SG HWW Niederroßbach, and later in the Canadian Soccer League with Hamilton City SC. In 2019, he returned to the Bezirksliga to play with TuS Montabaur.

International career 
Zelenika made his debut for the Croatia national under-19 football team on February 13, 2006 in a friendly match against Hungary. He represented Croatia in the 2006 Elite Round  U-19 Championship against Macedonia, and Israel. He also played with the Croatia national under-20 football team making his debut on September 26, 2006 in a friendly match against Slovenia.

References

External links
 

1987 births
Living people
People from Požega, Croatia
Association football midfielders
Croatian footballers
Croatia youth international footballers
NK Kamen Ingrad players
NK Široki Brijeg players
HNK Suhopolje players
NK Imotski players
NK Rudeš players
Hamilton City SC players
Croatian Football League players
First Football League (Croatia) players
Premier League of Bosnia and Herzegovina players
Canadian Soccer League (1998–present) players
Croatian expatriate footballers
Expatriate footballers in Bosnia and Herzegovina
Croatian expatriate sportspeople in Bosnia and Herzegovina
Expatriate footballers in Switzerland
Croatian expatriate sportspeople in Switzerland
Expatriate soccer players in Canada
Croatian expatriate sportspeople in Canada
Expatriate footballers in Germany
Croatian expatriate sportspeople in Germany